Glenelg Highway is a rural highway in south-eastern Australia, linking Mount Gambier with Ballarat. Most of the highway is located within the Western part of the state of Victoria, though a short, 15 km stretch from the South Australia/Victoria state border near Ardno to Glenburnie (6 km east of central Mount Gambier) is located in South Australia. Some maps identify the South Australian stretch as Casterton Road. Major towns along its route include Casterton, Coleraine and Hamilton.

History
The passing of the Highways and Vehicles Act of 1924 through the Parliament of Victoria provided for the declaration of State Highways, roads two-thirds financed by the State government through the Country Roads Board (later VicRoads). The Glenelg Highway was declared a State Highway in the 1947/48 financial year, from Ballarat via Skipton, and Hamilton to Casterton (for a total of 149 miles); before this declaration, the roads were referred to as Hamilton-Coleraine-Casterton Road and Ballarat-Hamilton Road.

The alignment of the highway through Ballarat was changed in June 1983: previously terminating at the intersection of Albert and Hertford Streets in Sebastopol, it was extended north 3 km along Albert Street, Skipton Street, and Doveton Street South to terminate at Sturt Street (Western Highway) in central Ballarat, only to be truncated back to its original terminus in Sebastopol in May 1990; the former alignment was subsumed into the Midland Highway, re-aligned to this route at the same time. A new bridge over Hopkins River in Wickcliffe was opened in 1996, replacing an older, flood-prone structure and the last on the highway with a timber deck, at a cost of $145,000, with bridge approaches costing $700,000.

The Glenelg Highway was signed as State Route 112 between Glenburnie and Ballarat in 1986; with Victoria's conversion to the newer alphanumeric system in the late 1990s, this was replaced by route B160.

The passing of the Road Management Act 2004 granted the responsibility of overall management and development of Victoria's major arterial roads to VicRoads: in 2004, VicRoads re-declared the road as Glenelg Highway (Arterial #6670), beginning at the South Australian border and ending at Midland Highway in Sebastopol, Ballarat.

Major Intersections and Towns

See also

 Highways in Australia
 List of highways in Victoria

References

Highways in Australia
Highways in Victoria (Australia)
Transport in Barwon South West (region)